Viera West is a census-designated place (CDP) in Brevard County, Florida, United States. The population was 16,668 at the 2020 census. It forms a part of the larger unincorporated community of Viera and is part of the Palm Bay–Melbourne–Titusville Metropolitan Statistical Area.

Geography
Viera West is located at  (28.2477, -80.7378), to the west of Interstate 95.

Demographics

See also
Viera, Florida
Viera East, Florida

References

Census-designated places in Brevard County, Florida
Census-designated places in Florida